Xar may refer to:

 Xar (graphics), a file format used with vector graphics
 XAR, a file archiver and its associated file format
 Michael Portnoy, who uses the stage name XAR 
 The ICAO Code for Travel Express Aviation Services, Indonesia